Alkalihalobacillus oshimensis is a Gram-positive, aerobic, facultatively alkaliphilic, halophilic and halotolerant bacterium from the genus of Alkalihalobacillus which has been isolated from soil from Oshyamanbe from Japan.

References

Bacillaceae
Bacteria described in 2005